Dinhata College (Bengali: দিনহাটা মহাবিদ্যালয়) established in 1956, is one of the oldest college in Dinhata. It offers undergraduate courses in arts, commerce and sciences. The campus is in the Cooch Behar district. It is affiliated to Cooch Behar Panchanan Barma University. Formerly affiliated to University of North Bengal.

Departments

Science

 Chemistry
 Physics
 Mathematics
 Botany
 Zoology

Arts and Commerce

 Hindi
 English
 History
 Political Science
 Philosophy
 Geography
 Economics
 Sanskrit
 Commerce

Accreditation
The college is recognized by the University Grants Commission (UGC).

See also

References

External links 
 dinhata college

Universities and colleges in Cooch Behar district
Colleges affiliated to Cooch Behar Panchanan Barma University
Academic institutions formerly affiliated with the University of North Bengal
Educational institutions established in 1956
1956 establishments in West Bengal